Ligand may refer to:
 Ligand, an atom, ion, or functional group that donates one or more of its electrons through a coordinate covalent bond to one or more central atoms or ions
 Ligand (biochemistry), a substance that binds to a protein 
 a 'guest' in host–guest chemistry

See also

Ligand-gated ion channel